Defending champions Todd Woodbridge and Mark Woodforde defeated Grant Connell and Patrick Galbraith in a rematch of the previous year's final, 7–6(7–3), 6–3, 6–1 to win the gentlemen's doubles title at the 1994 Wimbledon Championships. It was the Woodies' second Wimbledon title and third major title overall.

Seeds

  Byron Black /  Jonathan Stark (third round)
  Grant Connell /  Patrick Galbraith (final)
  Jacco Eltingh /  Paul Haarhuis (quarterfinals)
  Jan Apell /  Jonas Björkman (third round)
  Todd Woodbridge /  Mark Woodforde (champions)
  Tom Nijssen /  Cyril Suk (quarterfinals)
  David Adams /  Andrei Olhovskiy (first round)
  Henrik Holm /  Anders Järryd (first round)
  Patrick McEnroe /  Richey Reneberg (first round)
  Hendrik Jan Davids /  Piet Norval (first round)
  Rick Leach /  Danie Visser (second round)
  Martin Damm /  Karel Nováček (third round)
  Ken Flach /  Mark Knowles (second round)
  Marc-Kevin Goellner /  Yevgeny Kafelnikov (semifinals)
  Brad Pearce /  Dave Randall (first round)
  Wayne Ferreira /  Michael Stich (semifinals)

Qualifying

Draw

Finals

Top half

Section 1

Section 2

Bottom half

Section 3

Section 4

References

External links

1994 Wimbledon Championships – Men's draws and results at the International Tennis Federation

Men's Doubles
Wimbledon Championship by year – Men's doubles